Moodyville is an unincorporated community in Pickett County, Tennessee, United States.  Its elevation is 1,010 feet (308 m).  A post office was once located at Moodyville, but it has since closed.

References

Unincorporated communities in Pickett County, Tennessee
Unincorporated communities in Tennessee